"Cannonball" is a song by Dutch electronic music duo Showtek and Dutch DJ Justin Prime. The song was released as a digital download on October 29, 2012 through Tiësto's label Musical Freedom and on January 7, 2013 through Spinnin Records. The song was written and produced by Showtek and Justin Prime. The song has charted in Belgium, France and Netherlands, and was certified gold in the latter.

Track listing

Charts

Certifications

Cannonball (Earthquake)

Showtek and Justin Prime released a second version of the song titled "Cannonball (Earthquake)" featuring guest vocals from American singer Matthew Koma. It was released worldwide as a digital download on 16 December 2013. In the United Kingdom, it was released on April 11, 2014, where he managed to reach number 29 in the singles chart.

Will Ferrell version 
A version of the song sampling a sound bite of a scene from the 2004 comedy film Anchorman: The Legend of Ron Burgundy was played by Showtek in numerous shows titled "Cannonball (Will Ferrell Sit Down Mix)". This version of the song has never been released to the public.

Track listing

Charts

References

2012 songs
2012 singles
2013 singles
Showtek songs
Spinnin' Records singles
Polydor Records singles